The 1915–16 Northern Rugby Football Union season was the first season of Rugby league's Wartime Emergency League football. Each club played a differing number of fixtures, depending upon the closeness of neighbours, ease of travel etc., with York playing only 11 and Barrow 13 while Salford played 35 and Dewsbury 36.

Season summary

Although the war was starting its second year, the Rugby League decided to introduce a Wartime Emergency League. This arrangement, as in other sports, meant that the sport could continue, which in turn would boost the public’s moral. The fixtures were usually quite local, thus cutting down on travelling time and costs, whilst not wasting precious war resources.

Several clubs did not participate during this season :-
Wakefield Trinity
Warrington
Widnes
Keighley, who did not re-enter until the first Peacetime League in 1919-20.

Three new clubs joined the league for this season :-
St Helens Recs, originally the works team for Pilkington Glass. There are now two clubs playing in St Helens.
A reformed Brighouse Rangers.
A team called Featherstone Rovers. The Featherstone Rovers who currently play in the Rugby League merged with Purston White Horse ARLFC in 1913 and did not become a semi-professional club until 14 June 1921. This newly entered club only remained in the league for one season.

Dewsbury and Leeds finished the regular season joint top of the league, based on the % system, both having obtained an 83.33% success, but Dewsbury took the title due to them having gained an extra 5 points (from the 3 extra games played).

There were no other trophies to play for during this season.

Championship

Challenge Cup

The Challenge Cup Competition was suspended for the duration of the war.

The majority of the trophies, such as the County Leagues and County Cups were also suspended for the duration of the First World War.

Notes and Comments 

1 - A new team St Helens Recs who would continue in the League until 1939
2 - A new team, Featherstone Rovers joined the league for this season only
3 - A newly reformed Brighouse Rangers also joined for this season

See also 
 British rugby league system
 1915–16 Northern Rugby Football Union Wartime Emergency League season
 1916–17 Northern Rugby Football Union Wartime Emergency League season
 1917–18 Northern Rugby Football Union Wartime Emergency League season
 1918–1919 (January) Northern Rugby Football Union Wartime Emergency League season
 1919 (Feb-May) Northern Rugby Football Union Victory season
 The Great Schism – Rugby League View
 The Great Schism – Rugby Union View
 List of defunct rugby league clubs

References

External links 
1896–97 Northern Rugby Football Union season at wigan.rlfans.com
Hull&Proud Fixtures & Results 1896/1897
 Widnes Vikings - One team, one passion Season In Review - 1896-97
Saints Heritage Society
Warrington History
Wigan Archives - Cherry and white

Defunct rugby league teams
1915 in English rugby league
1916 in English rugby league
Northern Rugby Football Union seasons